Fame was launched in India in 1786. She was sold to Portuguese owners. A French privateer captured but the Royal Navy recaptured her in 1794. She then became a West Indiaman, sailing from Liverpool. Between 1796 and 1804 she made three voyages as a slave ship. She then returned to the West Indies trade. From 1818 on she was a whaler in the Greenland whale fishery, sailing from Whitby and then Hull. She burnt in 1823 while outward bound on a whaling voyage.

Career

Origins
Fame was built in India in 1786, or 1787. At some point her owners sold her to Portuguese owners. The French privateer Marseilles captured her but then  recaptured her. She was condemned at Roseau, Dominica on 18 June 1794, and duty on her was paid at Liverpool on 9 February 1795.

Fame first appeared in Lloyd's Register (LR) in 1795. This entry gave her origins as the E.Indies. It gave her origins as the East Indies and made no mention of her being a prize. She then became a West Indiaman.

Slave ship (1796–1804)
In 1796 Fame sailed on the first of three slave-trading voyages. 

1st slave voyage (1796–1797): Captain Robert Bennett acquired a letter of marque on 20 October 1796. He sailed from Liverpool on 26 October, bound for Bonny Island. On 25 November, as she sailed to purchase her slaves, Fame recaptured Bernard. Bernard had been sailing from Demerara to Bremen with a cargo of coffee and cotton for Messrs Neilsen and Heathcote when a French frigate and a brig had captured her. After Fame recaptured Bernard, Bernard sailed to Swansea.  Fame stopped at Barbados, and arrived at Kingston, Jamaica, on 21 June 1797 with 480 slaves. She sailed from Kingston on 26 July and arrived back at Liverpool on 18 October. She had left Liverpool with 42 crew members and she suffered five crew deaths on her voyage.

Mercantile voyage (1798–1799): Captain Thomas Atkinson acquired a letter of marque on 5 March 1798. He sailed Fame to Grenada via Madeira. On 29 March 1799 LL reported that Fame, Atkinson, master, had been sailing from Demerara to Liverpool when she had put into St Vincents.

2nd slave voyage (1800–1802): Captain Owen Prichard acquired a letter of marque on 21 July 1800. He sailed from Liverpool on 8 August. Fame purchased her slaves at Calabar. She arrived at Trinidad on 12 October 1801, where she landed c. 300 slaves. At some point Captain John Campbell replaced Prichard. She arrived back at Liverpool on 18 January 1802. She had left Liverpool with 42 crew members and suffered 12 crew deaths during the voyage.

3rd slave voyage (1803–1804): Captain Richard Davidson acquired a letter of marque on 8 October 1803. He sailed from Liverpool on 16 November 1803 and purchased her slaves at Rio Pongas, Cape Grand Mount, and Gallinhas. Fame then arrived at Demerara on 14 April 1804. She had embarked 338 slaves and she landed 315. Fame arrived back at Liverpool on 21 September 1804. She had left Liverpool with 49 crew members and had suffered seven crew deaths on the voyage.

West Indiaman
Fame returned to the West Indies trade.

In January 1806 Fame sailed for Demerara but had to put back to Liverpool, having suffered damage in a gale. In her trade with Demerara Fame returned with sugar, cotton, and coffee.

On 5 September 1807 Captain Phillip Williams acquired a letter of marque.

Northern Whale Fishery
Fame was registered at Whitby in January 1818. One source states that Scoresby (Snr) purchased her in 1817 as a French prize. Another source declares her a Portuguese prize. She appeared in the Register of Shipping in 1818 with origin India, but no date of building, or mention of her being a prize.

For her first voyage to the Northern Whale Fisheries she sailed from Liverpool on 2 April 1818 and returned to Whitby on 18 August. From 1821 on she sailed from Hull. The data in the table is from Coltish:

On the 1821 whaling voyage Fame carried Congreve rockets. Sir William Congreve equipped her with rockets at his own expense to test their utility in whaling hunting. The Master General of Ordnance and the First Lord of the Admiralty had Lieutenant Colquhoun and two Marine artillerymen accompany the rockets as observers. Captain Scoresby wrote a letter from the Greenland fishery in June reporting that the rockets had been a great success. Subsequent reports made clear that the rockets were fired from about 40 yards and were highly effective in killing whales that had already been conventionally harpooned. In December Lieutenant Colquhoun demonstrated the use of the rockets at Annapolis, Maryland. A newspaper story gave a detailed account of the experiments he performed. 

On 27 August 1822, a storm dismasted Dundee in the Greenland whale fishery and trapped her in ice. Fame, Scoresby, Snr., pulled Dundee out and stayed with her until Dundee had rigged jury masts and was sufficiently equipped and supplied to reach Liverpool.

William Scoresby, Jr William Scoresby, Sr, registered Fame at Hull in 1823 after having her almost rebuilt.

Fate
Fame burned at Dear Sound, in Orkney, on 23 April 1823. Some of the crew arrived at Lieth on 27 April.

Captain Scoresby, Sr, retired after 37 years in the Arctic.

Notes, citations, and references
Notes

Citations

References
 
  
 
  
 

1780s ships
British ships built in India
Captured ships
Age of Sail merchant ships of England
Liverpool slave ships
Whaling ships
Maritime incidents in April 1823